Arcola is an offshoot of the record label Warp Records. It was set up in late 2003, and takes its name from the Arcola Theatre, Arcola Street in Dalston, London where Warp held the launch party for the label. It released a number of singles in 2003 and 2004. Arcola marked its return after a 14-year hiatus in January 2018, with new EP's by Rian Treanor & 2814.

Details
All Arcola releases are 12-inch singles released in a generic sleeve designed by The Designers Republic. Although some artists such as Brothomstates and Milanese are shared by both the Warp and Arcola label, Arcola releases are always more dancefloor-oriented.

Artists
Brothomstates (Lassi Nikko)
Cane
Denis Rusnak
Dub Kult (Neilon Pitamber)
Louis Digital
Milanese
Rian Treanor
2814
Nkisi
Our Souls Are In The Hands Of The Translator
Primitive Art

See also
 List of record labels

References

External links
 Warp Records
 Arcola

British record labels
Electronic music record labels
Record labels established in 2003